Labeobarbus progenys is a species of cyprinid fish found in the African countries of Cameroon and West Congo, as well as a questionable presence in Angola.

References 

Cyprinid fish of Africa
Taxa named by George Albert Boulenger
Fish described in 1903
progenys